is an album under an independent label by Saori Atsumi.

Track listing

2004 albums
Saori Atsumi albums
Being Inc. albums